Te Karaka is a small settlement inland from Gisborne, in the northeast of New Zealand's North Island. It is located in the valley of the Waipaoa River close to its junction with its tributary, the Waihora River. Te Karaka is located on State Highway 2, and is the largest settlement between Gisborne and Opotiki in the Bay of Plenty.

Te Karaka holds the current North Island weather high record, set on the 3rd of February, 2020, at 40 degrees Celsius recorded at 4pm that day.

Demographics
The population of Te Karaka was 522 in the 2018 census, an increase of 39 from 2013. There were 261 males and 264 females. 35.1% of people identified as European/Pākehā, 92.3% as Māori and 2.8% as Pacific peoples. In the 2013 census, 25.2%t of the people in Te Karaka spoke Maori Language.

The statistical area of Waipaoa, which covers 2278 square kilometres including Otoko, had a population of 1,953 at the 2018 New Zealand census, an increase of 18 people (0.9%) since the 2013 census, and a decrease of 174 people (-8.2%) since the 2006 census. There were 675 households. There were 1,005 males and 945 females, giving a sex ratio of 1.06 males per female. The median age was 37.4 years (compared with 37.4 years nationally), with 468 people (24.0%) aged under 15 years, 354 (18.1%) aged 15 to 29, 885 (45.3%) aged 30 to 64, and 246 (12.6%) aged 65 or older.

Ethnicities were 61.1% European/Pākehā, 51.9% Māori, 1.4% Pacific peoples, 1.1% Asian, and 1.2% other ethnicities (totals add to more than 100% since people could identify with multiple ethnicities).

The proportion of people born overseas was 4.9%, compared with 27.1% nationally.

Although some people objected to giving their religion, 46.5% had no religion, 30.7% were Christian, 0.2% were Buddhist and 15.2% had other religions.

Of those at least 15 years old, 180 (12.1%) people had a bachelor or higher degree, and 363 (24.4%) people had no formal qualifications. The median income was $26,600, compared with $31,800 nationally. The employment status of those at least 15 was that 753 (50.7%) people were employed full-time, 252 (17.0%) were part-time, and 63 (4.2%) were unemployed.

Parks

The settlement has a sports ground and local park, Te Karaka Recreation Ground.

Marae

Te Karaka has three marae belonging to the hapū of Te Aitanga-a-Māhaki.

Rangatira Marae and Whakahau meeting house is a meeting place of Ngāti Wahia.

Takipu Marae and Te Poho o Pikihoro meeting house is a meeting place of Te Whānau a Taupara.

Tapuihikitia and Te Aroha meeting house is a meeting place of Ngā Pōtiki and Te Whānau a Taupara. In October 2020, the Government committed $327,200 from the Provincial Growth Fund to upgrade the marae, creating an estimated 6 jobs.

Education

Te Karaka Area School is a Year 1-13 co-educational state area school with a roll of  students as of  The school opened in 2011, replacing the local primary school and Waikohu College.

References

Populated places in the Gisborne District